Moses Gbenga Makinde (born 15 November 1992) is an English professional footballer who currently plays as a defender for Maryland Bobcats FC in the National Independent Soccer Association.

Career
In July 2019, after 12 appearances in all competitions for Tulsa Roughnecks, Makinde joined fellow USL Championship side El Paso Locomotive by way of trade with Calvin Rezende moving in the opposite direction.

Makinde returned to the Baltimore area in January 2022, signing a contract with Maryland Bobcats FC of the National Independent Soccer Association. He had previously played with club before they turned professional.

References

External links
 

1992 births
Living people
Association football defenders
English footballers
NC State Wolfpack men's soccer players
Baltimore Bohemians players
Whitehawk F.C. players
VfB Auerbach players
CS Sportul Snagov players
Syrianska FC players
FC Tulsa players
El Paso Locomotive FC players
Soccer players from Maryland
USL League Two players
USL Championship players
Maryland Bobcats FC players